The Brass Ring was a group of American studio musicians led by saxophonist and arranger Phil Bodner. The band was based in New York City and was stylistically similar to The Tijuana Brass, The Brass Buttons, the Baja Marimba Band, and other "Now Sound" instrumental pop groups from the 1960s, although the twin-sax sound more closely resembles Billy Vaughn, whose biggest hits were in the 1950s.

In addition to several successful albums for ABC/Dunhill Records, the Brass Ring had two hit singles. The first, "Love Theme From The Flight Of The Phoenix", was used in the movie The Flight of the Phoenix, and reached #32 on the U.S. Billboard Hot 100 in 1966. The second, "The Dis-Advantages of You", written by Mitch Leigh, was used in a series of commercials for Benson & Hedges cigarettes, and rose to #36 in March 1967. Numerous other singles hit Billboard's Easy Listening chart, and a non-chart single, "Love In The Open Air", is prized by collectors, as it is a cover of a little-known composition by Paul McCartney.

The group recorded until at least 1972 on Enoch Light's Project 3 label.

Discography

Albums

Singles

References

American pop music groups
Dunhill Records artists
Easy listening musicians